FASTLIGHT is a small dimension, small weight (50 kg/110 lbs) precision guided glide bomb designed from deployment from small platforms that can attack both fixed and moving targets. It was developed by Israel Military Industries (IMI). The relatively light warhead is optimized for such missions where minimum collateral damage is of high importance. It features GPS/INS/Laser guidance with a CEP of 10m.

See also

 Small Diameter Bomb
 Griffin LGB
 Small Smart Weapon
 Spice (bomb)
 MSOV

References

Guided bombs of Israel
Aerial bombs of Israel